Streptomyces triticiradicis is a bacterium species from the genus of Streptomyces which has been isolated from rhizosphereic soil from wheat (Triticum aestivum L.). Streptomyces triticiradicis has antifungal properties.

See also 
 List of Streptomyces species

References 

triticiradicis
Bacteria described in 2020